Common is an American coliving company founded in 2015 and headquartered in New York City. Brad Hargreaves is the company's CEO and founder. As of June 2020, Common manages 48 multifamily buildings in nine cities across the U.S.: New York, Jersey City, Los Angeles, San Francisco, Chicago, Washington, D.C., Seattle, Philadelphia, and Fort Lauderdale. The company has plans to expand to 22 cities across the globe, and has 15,000 beds signed and under development.

In March 2019, Common partnered with New York real-estate developer Tishman Speyer to launch the brand Kin, whose "buildings will feature playrooms, family-size units and on-demand child care through an internal mobile app that also helps connect families looking to share nannies and babysitters."  In May 2020, Common announced the launch of Noah, a workforce housing brand. Noah operates “Class B and C multifamily buildings where renters earn 40 percent to 80 percent of the area median income” and as of March 2020, is operating “500 units over five properties in Hampton Roads and Winchester, Virginia.” 

From 2015 to 2017, Common raised $63.35 million in funding. The latest Series C funding round led by Norwest Venture Partners raised $40 million.

References

External links
 

2015 establishments in New York City
Companies based in Manhattan
Housing organizations in the United States
Real estate companies of the United States
Privately held companies of the United States